The men's 400 metres event at the 1982 Commonwealth Games was held on 3 and 4 October at the QE II Stadium in Brisbane, Australia.

Medalists

Results

Heats
Qualification: First 6 in each heat (Q) and the next 6 fastest (q) qualify for the quarterfinals.

Quarterfinals
Qualification: First 4 in each heat (Q) and the next 2 fastest (q) qualify for the semifinals.

Semifinals
Qualification: First 4 in each semifinal (Q) and the next 1 fastest (q) qualify for the final.

Final

References

Heats & Quarterfinals results (The Sydney Morning Herald)
Final results (The Sydney Morning Herald)
Heat & Quarterfinals results (The Canberra Times)
Semifinals & Final results (The Canberra Times)
Australian results 

Athletics at the 1982 Commonwealth Games
1982